The Heinis was a French automobile manufactured in Neuilly from 1925 until 1930.  The brainchild of one M. Heinis, the cars were offered with various engines, including an ohc 799 cc four which Heinis himself designed.  Other offerings included various proprietary 1100 cc, 1170 cc, 1690 cc, and 1947 cc units and a 5000 cc Lycoming eight.

References
David Burgess Wise, The New Illustrated Encyclopedia of Automobiles

Defunct motor vehicle manufacturers of France